Chumar Bakhoor or Chumar Bakur is a gemstone mining area located at an elevation of 5,520 meters in the Sumayar Valley of Nagar District, Gilgit-Baltistan, Pakistan. Geographically it is also closer to the Oyum-Nagar (Nagarkhas). Walking from central Sumayar, it takes around 4 to 5 hours to reach the pegmatites that crop out on the western side of the mountain above 4000 meters elevation. Appiani (2007) states that according to (Blauwet and Shah, 2004) the gemstone deposits at Chumar Bakhoor were first discovered in 1984 by local hunter Muhammad Shah.
Chumar Bakhoor contains various precious and semi-precious gemstones such as Aquamarine, Fluorite, Apatite, Calcite, and Quartz.

Precious and Semi-Precious Gemstones
Aquamarine 
Fluorite

Chumar Bakur Pass
The Chumar Bakhoor pass links the Sumayar valley with the Nagar Khas.

See also
 Nagar Valley
 Nagar District
 Gilgit-Baltistan

References

Nagar District
Gemstone mines
Geography of Gilgit-Baltistan
Mines in Pakistan